The 1963 Cincinnati Reds season consisted of the Cincinnati Reds finishing in fifth place in the National League with a record of 86–76, 13 games behind the NL and World Series Champion Los Angeles Dodgers. The Reds were managed by Fred Hutchinson and played their home games at Crosley Field.

Offseason 
 November 26, 1962: Brant Alyea was drafted from the Reds by the Washington Senators in the 1962 first-year draft.
 January 24, 1963: Don Zimmer was traded by the Reds to the Los Angeles Dodgers for Scott Breeden (minors).
 Prior to 1963 season: Stan Swanson was signed as an amateur free agent by the Reds.

Regular season 
1963 was Pete Rose's rookie season. He made his major league debut on Opening Day, April 8, against the Pittsburgh Pirates. He had three at bats without a hit, but did draw a walk. Rose started his career 0-for-11 before getting his first major league hit on April 13, a triple off Pittsburgh's Bob Friend.

Season standings

Record vs. opponents

Notable transactions 
 May 5, 1963: Jim Brosnan was traded by the Reds to the Chicago White Sox for Dom Zanni.
 July 1, 1963: Jesse Gonder was traded by the Reds to the New York Mets for Charlie Neal and Sammy Taylor.

Roster

Player stats

Batting

Starters by position 
Note: Pos = Position; G = Games played; AB = At bats; H = Hits; Avg. = Batting average; HR = Home runs; RBI = Runs batted in

Other batters 
Note: G = Games played; AB = At bats; H = Hits; Avg. = Batting average; HR = Home runs; RBI = Runs batted in

Pitching

Starting pitchers 
Note: G = Games pitched; IP = Innings pitched; W = Wins; L = Losses; ERA = Earned run average; SO = Strikeouts

Other pitchers 
Note: G = Games pitched; IP = Innings pitched; W = Wins; L = Losses; ERA = Earned run average; SO = Strikeouts

Relief pitchers 
Note: G = Games pitched; W = Wins; L = Losses; SV = Saves; ERA = Earned run average; SO = Strikeouts

Awards and honors 
Rookie of the Year Award
 Pete Rose

Gold Glove Award
 Johnny Edwards, catcher

All-Stars 
All-Star Game
 Jim O'Toole, starter, pitcher
 Johnny Edwards, reserve

Farm system

References

External links 
1963 Cincinnati Reds season at Baseball Reference

Cincinnati Reds seasons
Cincinnati Reds season
Cincinnati Reds